Tokyo Ghoul: re Call to Exist is a survival action video game developed by Three Rings and published by Bandai Namco Entertainment for Microsoft Windows and PlayStation 4 in November 2019. It is based on Sui Ishida's manga series Tokyo Ghoul and Tokyo Ghoul: Re

GameplayTokyo Ghoul: re Call to Exist is a third-person survival action game in which players can choose to be on the side of ghouls or investigators, with playable characters including Haise Sasaki, Ken Kaneki, Kōtarō Amon, Kishō Arima, Tōuka Kirishima, and Shū Tsukiyama. The game has an online multiplayer mode.

DevelopmentTokyo Ghoul: re Call to Exist was developed by Three Rings, and is based on Sui Ishida's manga series Tokyo Ghoul (2011–2014) and Tokyo Ghoul: Re (2014–2018).

The game was released by Bandai Namco Entertainment for PlayStation 4 in Japan on November 14, 2019, and for both PlayStation 4 and Microsoft Windows internationally on November 15, 2019. It had originally been slated for release in late 2018, but was delayed due to quality concerns.

ReceptionTokyo Ghoul: re Call to Exist was met by mixed reviews, ranging from positive to negative, according to the review aggregator Metacritic.

The game's physical release sold an estimated 4,500 copies in Japan during its debut week, ranking as the 15th best selling physical video game in Japan during the time period; by its second week on sale, it no longer charted on Famitsu'' weekly top 30 sales chart.

Notes

References

External links

Action video games
Survival video games
2019 video games
Bandai Namco games
PlayStation 4 games
Tokyo Ghoul
Video games developed in Japan
Video games set in Tokyo
Windows games